Colon is an unincorporated community in Lee County, North Carolina, United States. It was also known as Buckner.

Coal from the Egypt Mine used to be delivered to the Seaboard Railroad station here.  Gas-fired brick was also made here.  A post office was established as "Bucker" in 1891 and was renamed "Colon" in 1892.

References

Unincorporated communities in Lee County, North Carolina
Unincorporated communities in North Carolina